Lepidus may refer to:

 Lepidus (triumvir) (c. 89–13 BC), member of the Second Triumvirate in ancient Rome
 Marcus Aemilius Lepidus (disambiguation), several other Roman politicians
 Lepidus (dinosaur), a theropod dinosaur genus

See also
 Lepida (disambiguation)
 Lapidus (name)